Changchun World Sculpture Park is located in Changchun, Jilin, China. It is a collection of Eastern and Western art and sculpture set in a natural landscape and run as a theme park. It was named a national 5A-class tourist attraction.

Changchun World Sculpture Park was founded in 2001, and officially opened in September 2003. The park features a combination of natural landscapes and cultural landscapes. With the theme of "friendship, peace and spring", the park combines Eastern and Western cultures and arts with unique charm and style.

The sculpture tower, which embodies the theme of "friendship, peace and spring", was co-authored by the famous domestic sculpture masters Ye Shan, Pan He, Cheng Yun Xian, Wang Keqing and Cao Chunsheng.

Located in the garden is the Changchun Sculpture Museum building which has an area of 12,500 square meters. The museum features a special exhibition area, now possession of hundreds of magical African horse Conde wood carvings and a large number of Chinese and foreign famous sculptor sculpture quality.

Changchun World Sculpture Park has a large number of works of art, a wide range of artistic styles. It has more than 340 sculptures from more than 130 countries and over 300 sculptors. There is a masterpiece that reflects Ma'anshan culture, Eskimos culture and Māori culture, as well as the emblems of Indo-European culture, African culture, Latin American culture and oriental culture, which fully reflect the national, ethnic and geographical features and are rich in materials and different in style.

Classic works 
 Cheng Yun-Xian's "Iron Horse Jin Ge"
 Chen Yun Gang's "Big East to go"
 French sculptor Rodin's "The Thinker"
 German sculptor Maisiya Si "safe"
 African Macond wood carving
 "fly"
 "Observer"
 "Nile"
 "Spring Love"
 "Sea Flowers"
 "Pangu"

References

Buildings and structures in Changchun
Tourist attractions in Jilin
2001 establishments in China
Sculpture gardens, trails and parks in China